The International Knockout Mouse Consortium (IKMC) is a scientific endeavour to produce a collection of mouse embryonic stem cell lines that together lack every gene in the genome, and then to distribute the cells to scientific researchers to create knockout mice to study. Many of the targeted alleles are designed so that they can generate both complete and conditional gene knockout mice.
The IKMC was initiated on March 15, 2007 at a meeting in Brussels. By 2011, Nature reported that approximately 17,000 different genes have already been disabled by the consortium, "leaving only around 3,000 more to go".

The consortium encompasses four major, high-throughput gene-targeted mutagenesis programs: the National Institutes of Health (NIH)-sponsored Knockout Mouse Program (KOMP) and state-funded Texas Institute for Genomic Medicine (TIGM) in the U.S., the North American Conditional Mouse Mutagenesis (NorCOMM) Program in Canada, and the European Conditional Mouse Mutagenesis (EUCOMM) Programme in Europe. The first of its annual meetings of members and funders, hosted by the country of its rotating chair, was held at the NIH in Bethesda, Maryland in the United States for 2007–2008, with Toronto, Canada hosting for 2008–2009.

References

External links 
International Knockout Mouse Consortium
Knockout Mouse Project (KOMP) Repository
North American Conditional Mouse Mutagenesis (NorCOMM) Program
European Union Conditional Mouse Mutagenesis (EUCOMM) Programme
Texas Institute for Genomic Medicine (TIGM)

Biological databases
Genetically modified organisms